Dr. Khastagir Government Girls' High School is a governmental secondary school in Chattogram, Bangladesh. It is near Jamal Khan, in the central part of the city. It was established by Annadacharan Khastagir, a pioneer in women's education in Chittagong during the late 19th century.

History 

The school was founded by Dr. Annadacharan Khastagir. During the colonial era, women of the conservative Bangladesh (then part of British India) were behind in education. The situation was worsened by the socio-cultural norms of keeping girls veiled and away from public spaces. Therefore, most educated women were taught at home by their liberal fathers or husbands.

In the midst of this background, Khastagir established the school to provide education to girls. He established a vernacular medium school at Jamal Khan Road in the port city in 1878. Eminent lawyer of the British colonial era, Jatra Mohan Sen (widely known as JM Sen), who married Binodini, third daughter of Dr. Khastagir, made the school exclusively for girls in 1907 and renamed it as Dr. Khastagir Girls' School in memory of his wife and father-in-law after Binodini died in 1906. JM Sen donated seven acres of land and a building to upgrade it into a high English school, which was later subsidized by the government and named as Dr Khastagir's Govt High English School For Girls.

The school celebrated its 100 years in 2007. Many of its alumnae gathered to join in the three-day-long celebration. The celebration ended with turning off all the dazzling lights and lighting approximately 2,000 candles gradually on the campus, with the participating students, teachers and guests singing Tagore's "Purano Sei Diner Kotha".

Since its journey with only three students (Anna Sen, Prem Kusum and Juni), the school produced hundreds of scholars during the past 100 years. It is one of the oldest and prestigious schools in Chittagong, as well as in the country. The school has earned fame and respect for its academic excellence, extra-curricular activities and development of girls' education.

Facilities 
The school has a large compound with playgrounds, computer lab, science labs, halls and auditorium.

Academics 
The school follows the general national curriculum of the Bangladeshi education system and provides education to girls from primary (starting from grade 5) to secondary level (grades 6 to 10).

There are two academic terms in the year. The first starts around mid-June and ends at the beginning of July. The final term starts around last-November  and ends at the beginning of November.

The students have a month-long summer holiday after the first term and winter holidays after their final term.

Shifts 
Due to the large number of students that enroll, the school is divided into two shifts. The morning shift starts at 7 a.m. and ends at 12p.m. The day shift starts at 12.30 p.m and dissolves around 5 p.m.

The school has colorful uniforms with students from the morning shift wear dark blue kamiz; students from the day shift wear sea green kameez, with white salwar, white scarf, white cross-belts and a distinguishing red belt. The girls tie their hair with white ribbons.

Extracurricular activities
Apart from the general curriculum, the school encourages students to engage in extra-curricular activities. Some of these include learning language (with British Council), debating, drawing and Girl Guides.

Rituals 
Both shifts start with a unique ritual of prayer, oath and drill. The school's two regular traditional drills are known as the "Roman Nritya" and the "Rann Sangeet" (literally meaning the battle song) by Kazi Nazrul Islam.

Societies 
The school runs a reading group with Bishwo Shahitto Kendro a Bangladeshi reading institution which promotes reading.

Sports and celebrations 

The school has an Annual Sports Day performance of drills. During the first term, the students take nearly a month after-school to prepare for the drill. Usually the girls from grade 6 to grade 8 perform it. The students are separated into a few groups, such as Luddi with kartals, Gypsy with tambourines and Lathi with canes.

The school celebrates its Annual Cultural Day (also known as the Farewell Day), whereby students, including many of the school's nationally acclaimed child artists, perform music, dance, drama, poetry, etc. It is called the Farewell Day, because the show is hosted as a tribute to the senior school leavers.

The school marks each year with an Annual Prayer.

Notable alumni

 Novera Ahmed – sculptor; credited for the original design of the Shaheed Minar monument 
 Tahmina Banu – head, paediatric surgery department, Chittagong Medical College Hospital
 Kalpana Datta – anti-British revolutionary
 Maitreyi Devi – poet, novelist; protégée of the poet Rabindranath Tagore
 Shamsunnahar Mahmud – writer, politician and educator
 Pratibha Mutsuddi – Bengali Language Movement hero, educator and women activist; recipient, Ekushey Padak award
 Ivy Rahman – politician; affiliated with the Bangladesh Awami League
 Sufia Rahman – former adviser to a caretaker government
 General Suraiya Rahman – Bangladesh's first female brigadier
 Pritilata Waddedar – anti-British revolutionary

See also

 Education in Bangladesh
 List of schools in Chittagong

References

1907 establishments in India
Day schools
Schools in Chittagong
Educational institutions established in 1907
Girls' schools in Bangladesh
Public schools in Chittagong